Gary A. Olson (born December 12, 1954) is a scholar of rhetoric and culture, a literary biographer, and president of Daemen College. He has served as provost and vice president for academic affairs at Idaho State University, dean of the College of Arts and Sciences at Illinois State University, and chief academic officer at the University of South Florida, St. Petersburg.

Olson served as a monthly columnist on higher education administration for the Chronicle of Higher Education from February 2006 to August 2013, and he wrote for the Huffington Post on similar topics from August 2013 to May 2017. He has written or edited 22 books and almost 100 essays and articles on subjects including the role of theory in rhetorical scholarship, the connections between ideology and discourse, and the contributions of Stanley Fish to literary and rhetorical studies.

Career
Olson obtained his PhD from Indiana University of Pennsylvania in 1980. His early research at the University of Alabama and the University of North Carolina-Wilmington focused on rhetoric and writing studies.

In 1985, Olson moved to the University of South Florida and became editor of the scholarly journal JAC, moving from writing studies toward the intersections between rhetoric, ideology, culture, and literary theory. While at the University of South Florida, Olson became a full professor.

In 1991, Olson began conducting scholarly interviews of internationally prominent intellectuals including anthropologist Clifford Geertz, linguist Noam Chomsky, deconstructionist Jacques Derrida, postmodern theorist Jean-François Lyotard, philosopher of science Sandra Harding, theorist and cultural critic Donna Haraway, political philosopher Ernesto Laclau, and feminist theorist bell hooks. These interviews were published in JAC and in a series of books.

In 1994, the Council of Editors of Learned Journals presented Olson with an International Award for Distinguished Editor for his decade of work editing JAC.

In 2002, the Association for Teachers of Advanced Composition established an annual book award in Olson's name: The Gary A. Olson Award for the most outstanding book on rhetorical and cultural theory. Also in 2002, Olson became interim associate vice president for academic affairs at the University of South Florida, St. Petersburg (chief academic officer).

In 2004, he became the dean of arts and sciences at Illinois State University, where he was also professor of English and affiliate faculty in the Women's Studies department.

In 2009, Olson became the provost and vice president for academic affairs at Idaho State University where he oversaw the creation of the institution's Division of Health Sciences, its College of Science and Engineering, and its College of Arts and Letters. In 2010, just months after arriving, Olson lost a non-binding vote of no-confidence by ISU faculty who criticized the new provost for his campus reorganization plans and for failing to adequately address faculty concerns. Though he was supported by President Arthur C. Vailas, Olson resigned from his VP post in June 2011.

In 2012, the Idaho Humanities Council awarded Olson a grant to help him complete the authorized biography of Stanley Fish, and Indiana University of Pennsylvania awarded him its highest honor: The Distinguished Alumni Award. He was also inducted into the Honor Society of Phi Kappa Phi, the "oldest and largest collegiate honor society dedicated to the recognition and promotion of academic excellence in all disciplines." Also in 2012, the Southeastern Writing Center Association announced an annual faculty award in Olson's name: The Gary A. Olson Scholarship. Olson founded the organization in 1980.

In 2013, Olson became president of Daemen College in Amherst, New York.

In 2014 and then again for each of the next three years, Olson was named one of Western New York's most influential leaders by Buffalo Business First, the region's weekly business newspaper.

Selected works

References

1954 births
Living people
American academic administrators
Rhetoric theorists